Medan Labuhan is the largest (in terms of km2) of the 21 administrative districts (kecamatan) in the city of Medan, North Sumatra, Indonesia.

Boundaries of the district (Indonesian: kecamatan):
 To the north: Medan Belawan
 To the south: Medan Deli
 To the west: Medan Marelan
 To the east: Deli Serdang Regency

At the 2010 Census, it had a population of 111,173 inhabitants; the latest official estimate (as at mid 2019) is 122,192. Total area is 36.67 km2 and the population density in 2019 was 3,332.2 inhabitants/km2.

References 

Districts of Medan